Mikhail Vladimirovich Sovetlyanov (born 3 June 1987) is a former Russian professional football player.

Club career
He played in the Russian Football National League for FC Shinnik Yaroslavl in 2007.

External links
 
 

1987 births
Living people
Russian footballers
Association football defenders
FC Shinnik Yaroslavl players
FC Dynamo Vologda players
FC Khimik Dzerzhinsk players
FC Orenburg players
FC Oryol players
FC Tekstilshchik Ivanovo players
FC Torpedo Vladimir players